Joseph Trimble can refer to:
Joseph Rothrock (Joseph Trimble Rothrock, 1839–1922), American environmentalist
Joseph T. Tracy (Joseph Trimble Tracy, 1865–1952, American politician from Ohio
Joe Trimble (1930–2011), American baseballer